Dead Man's Curve is a London surf music band, named after the hit song by Jan and Dean. Started in 1995 they played classic London venues such as the Borderline and the 100 Club. They received regular radio plays on BBC Radio 1 (Mark Lamarr, Mark Radcliffe) and XFM, and have played with many of the surf bands including Jon & The Nightriders and The Surfin' Lungs.

Members
Buzz T. – guitar
Dick Van – bass
Django – guitar and theremin – Django is now heading up Los Fantasticos, a Brighton-based surf quartet whose album Return of the Leopardman, was released in November 2005.
Gus – drums
Johnny – organ

Although Johnny has moved to Toronto and Buzz T. to Sydney, the band still managed to record "In a Groovy Grave" via the internet for the Frankie Stein and The Ghouls tribute compilation in 2003, although this album never saw the light of day. Django and Gus played together in a band called The Ogdens in the 1980s.

Discography

Albums
We Will Prevail – Gorgeous Records 1999
World Catastrophe Generator – Gorgeous Records 1998

Singles
"Surfquake" – Gorgeous Records 1997
"Tombstone" – Gorgeous Records/Bandcamp 2018

Compilations
Frankie Stein and The Ghouls tribute featuring the track "In a Groovy Grave" – K.R.E.E.P.Y. Records 2003
The Missing Chord featuring the track "Charlie’s Point" – Snatch Records 1996

References

External links
Official website
Discography
First Single Video
Online encyclopaedia entry
Live Review in The Independent
HangNine FM on North Sea Surf Radio - Playlists
Recognition from Jan Berry (Jan & Dean)
Record sales
Record sales

Surf music groups